Andrea Ferris (born 21 September 1987 in La Chorrera) is a Panamanian middle-distance runner. At the 2012 Summer Olympics, she competed in the Women's 800 metres.

In December 2012, she married Peruvian middle-distance runner Mario Bazán.

Personal bests
400 m: 54.73 –  Ciudad de Guatemala, 18 September 2010
800 m: 2:01.63 –  Ponce, 12 May 2012
1500 m: 4:15.22–  Trujillo, 26 November 2013
3000 m: 9:45.00 –  Uberlândia, 26 May 2010
3000 m steeplechase: 10:03.21–  Trujillo, 28 November 2013

Achievements

References

External links

Panamanian female middle-distance runners
Panamanian female steeplechase runners
Living people
Olympic athletes of Panama
Athletes (track and field) at the 2012 Summer Olympics
Athletes (track and field) at the 2015 Pan American Games
Athletes (track and field) at the 2019 Pan American Games
Pan American Games competitors for Panama
1987 births
Central American and Caribbean Games silver medalists for Panama
Central American and Caribbean Games bronze medalists for Panama
Competitors at the 2010 Central American and Caribbean Games
Competitors at the 2018 Central American and Caribbean Games
Panamanian female cross country runners
South American Games silver medalists for Panama
South American Games medalists in athletics
Central American Games gold medalists for Panama
Central American Games medalists in athletics
Central American Games silver medalists for Panama
Competitors at the 2014 South American Games
Athletes (track and field) at the 2018 South American Games
Central American and Caribbean Games medalists in athletics
21st-century Panamanian women